Iowa Brass was formerly known as the Eastern Iowa Brass Band (EIBB), changing its name to Iowa Brass on June 17, 2021.

Iowa Brass is an amateur band which primarily performs brass band literature in the style and tradition of the British brass bands which date back to the early nineteenth century and continues today.  Iowa Brass also covers contemporary ensemble pieces, ranging from Broadway works, swing, New Orleans jazz and even Pat Metheny.

Founded in 1985, Iowa Brass is the only band of its kind in the state of Iowa. Iowa Brass plays in concert to audiences throughout the midwest. As an amateur band, members are drawn together from a variety of backgrounds in dedication to achieving excellence in the brass band musical tradition.

History of the band 

Iowa Brass, originally called The Eastern Iowa Brass Band, grew from a brass ensemble that was part of the City Band in Mt. Vernon, Iowa in 1985 after Don Stine, director of the city band, attended a seminar on the growing brass band movement in the United States. Regular rehearsals began soon thereafter, and the band competed in its first North American Brass Band Association (NABBA) Championship in April 1986 where they placed second in their class. The strong showing at such a prestigious competition prompted the founders to incorporate and formed the foundation for what is now one of the most prominent amateur brass bands in the country and the sole year-round British-style brass band in the state of Iowa.
2016 marked the 30th anniversary of the band. In celebration of this milestone, The band toured the upper Midwest over the summer, playing for and with other brass bands in Minnesota, Wisconsin, Illinois and Iowa. In 2018, the band entered into a new community relationship, relocating to dedicated facilities in Solon, Iowa after a 32 year run in Mt Vernon.

Directors 
1985-1986 Kurt Claussen
1986-1989 Steve Wright
1989-1991 Dr. Alan Stang
1991-2001 John W. de Salme
2001-2002 Thomas L. Nelson
2003-2003 Don Stine
2003-2007 Earle Dickinson
2007-2010 Casey Thomas
2010-2011 Joshua Thompson
2011-2013 Kate Wohlman
2013 Paul Waech
2013- present Alex Beamer

The Music 
British band instrumentation features horns which are conical in design, producing a mellow, rich sound that is both dynamic and colorful. EIBB conforms to the unique British band style, characteristically limiting its instrumentation to brass, including cornets, flugelhorn, tenor horns, euphoniums, baritones, trombones, and tubas, as well as percussion. 
The 35-member band performs from a repertoire which features original works for brass band, as well as arrangements of well known orchestral and wind band literature. In addition, featured soloists are frequently used in concert programs which also include marches, medleys, hymn tune arrangements, folk songs, American patriotic offerings, Broadway showtunes, and novelty features. The majority of the band's concert schedule takes place during the summer months for community celebrations, civic events, and countless special festivals. They have performed in a variety of settings, from ornate concert halls to outdoor parks. 
Local audiences can also hear the band at three annual subscription concerts presented in April, September, and December.

Awards 
The EIBB has competed in the NABBA annual championship competition since 1986 and has been named division champions six times. They have also won seven NABBA video competitions. In 1991, the band was featured by the Smithsonian Institution in the Festival of American Folklife in Washington D.C. On six occasions EIBB ('91, '94, '96, '02, '05, '16, '20) has been invited to present a feature program at the annual convention of the Iowa Bandmasters Association, and recently performed to a sellout crowd at the American School Band Directors Association convention. The band finished 2nd in the Championship Division of the 1998 North American Brass Band Association championship in Lexington, KY. The band captured 3rd place at the 2008 US Open Brass Band Championships in St. Charles, Illinois.  The band earned 3rd place in the 2nd Division at the 2013 North American Brass Band Association championship in Cincinnati, OH.  EIBB earned overall 3rd place at the 2015 U.S. Open (http://www.usopenbrass.org/pdfs/US_Open_2015.pdf) and also won in the categories of Best Performance of a March and Best Buskers.

Recordings 

Reverence (2016)
A collection of hymn tynes

Sweet Cornets (2009)
Music featuring the Cornet Section 

Marching On (2004)
With the Eastern Iowa Brass Band

Show Business (2001)
Music from stage and screen

 
The Spirit of Christmas (2001)
Selections for the holiday season

Contest Music Live! (1999)
Competition performances 1997-1999, recorded live

Celebrate (1996)
Popular selections from their summer concert series

NABBA Championships (1996)
Competition performances 1995-1996, recorded live

Remembering World War II (video)
World War II 50th anniversary commemorative concert

References

External links 
 Eastern Iowa Brass Band

American brass bands